ScholarBuys is an academic marketing company located in Carpentersville, Illinois, co-founded by Matt Ryan and Bob Smith. ScholarBuys uses group buying to leverage economies of scale in software licensing.

Company revenues doubled between 2008 and 2010, and the firm has launched an offshoot brand, VarsityBuys, which targets students, rather than college administrators. In Illinois, the company handles software licensing for over 50 colleges and universities, although the firm's reach is national. The company entered into a partnership in 2011 with the Federation of Independent Illinois Colleges and Universities.

ScholarBuys has been named to Inc Magazine's Inc. 5000 list four different times (2012, 2013, 2017, and 2018), including a ranking at #41 on the "Top 100" companies in Education.

References

Marketing companies of the United States
Companies based in Kane County, Illinois
American companies established in 2007
2007 establishments in Illinois
Technology companies established in 2007